Dr. Seuss' How the Grinch Stole Christmas! The Musical, or simply How the Grinch Stole Christmas! The Musical, is a seasonal musical adaptation of the 1957 Dr. Seuss book How the Grinch Stole Christmas!.

Productions

Minneapolis
Children's Theatre Company in Minneapolis first commissioned Dr. Seuss's How the Grinch Stole Christmas in 1994. In 2022, the production was presented by Children's Theatre Company for the 10th time.

San Diego
The musical was performed at the Old Globe Theatre, in San Diego, where it has run every Christmas season since 1998. The Old Globe production was directed by Jack O'Brien. This version featured songs from the television special, which had music by Albert Hague and lyrics by Seuss. A then-unknown Vanessa Hudgens played Cindy Lou Who (from 1998 to 1999). The original cast also featured Guy Paul as The Grinch, Don Lee Sparks as Old Max, and Rusty Ross as Young Max. Notable subsequent Grinches at the Old Globe include Jay Goede, Steve Blanchard, and Andrew Polec. Notable actors who have played Old Max include Ken Page, Steve Gunderson, and John Treacy Egan.

For the 2007 Christmas season, three new songs were added to both this and the subsequent Broadway production. These songs are "This Time of Year", "It's the Thought That Counts" and "Fah Who Doraze" (which was part of the 1966 animated television special).

Broadway
The musical was transferred to Broadway by Running Subway (James Sanna). This version with book and lyrics by Timothy Mason, original score by Mel Marvin, directed by Matt August and created and conceived by Jack O'Brien. The Broadway production debuted on November 8, 2006 at the Foxwoods Theatre (then the Hilton theatre) for the Christmas season and closed on January 7, 2007. This production is notable for being the first Broadway musical to offer 12 performances a week. In the first week of December 2006, the musical topped the Broadway Box Office grosses, putting an end to Wicked'''s top-grossing streak that had lasted 100 weeks.

The musical began its second limited run at the St. James Theatre on November 9, 2007 with Patrick Page returning to the title role and starring John Cullum as Old Max. It was originally planned that the show would run continuously with up to 15 performances a week until January 6, 2008, but the show was halted before the morning matinee of November 10 as a result of the 2007 Broadway stagehand strike. The show remained dark due to failed negotiations. On November 19 the show's general manager, David Waggett, announced that Local One had agreed to continue to work on the show due to the unique contracts with the show's stagehands, but later the same day the owners of St. James Theatre issued a statement that the musical will not reopen until the strike affecting all of Broadway had been settled. The producers of the musical brought the matter to court and were granted an injunction enabling the show to resume on November 23. The musical staged a total of 11 performances for the Thanksgiving weekend (November 23 to 25), an unusual occurrence for Broadway shows.

2008: US tour
A limited-engagement tour ran during the Christmas season of 2008. The musical started at the Hippodrome in Baltimore from November 11 to 23, and then played the Citi Performing Arts Center Wang Theatre in Boston from November 26 to December 28. Matt August directed the show, with John DeLuca as original choreographer and Bob Richard as co-choreographer. The cast included Stefán Karl Stefánsson (who is best remembered for playing the role of  Robbie Rotten on the children's TV series LazyTown) starring as the Grinch, Walter Charles as Old Max, and Andrew Keenan-Bolger as Young Max.

2009: Los Angeles
In 2009, the musical was produced at the Pantages Theatre in Hollywood, California, and ran from November 10 to December 27. Christopher Lloyd had initially signed on to play the Grinch, but later withdrew and was replaced by Stefán Karl. John Larroquette starred as Old Max, with Kayley Stallings and Issadora Ava Tulalian as Cindy Lou Who, and James Royce as Young Max.

2010–2015: North American National Tours
In 2010, a North American tour ran in the cities of Omaha, Houston, Dallas, Tempe and Toronto. Stefán Karl performed as the Grinch and Carly Tamer and Brooke Lynn Boyd alternated as Cindy Lou Who.

In 2011, the tour played Providence, Pittsburgh, Atlanta, St. Louis and San Francisco. Stefán Karl again performed as the Grinch, with Bob Lauder as Old Max, Seth Bazacas as Young Max, Brance Cornelius as Papa Who, and Serena Brook as Mama Who and Brooke Lynn Boyd as Cindy Lou Who.

In 2012, the production toured North America playing in Bloomington, Hartford, Richmond, Chicago and Detroit, with Stefán Karl performing as the Grinch. abouttheartists.com

In 2013, the production toured North America playing in Cincinnati, Durham, Rochester, Buffalo and San Antonio, with Stefán Karl performing as the Grinch.  prnewswire.com

In 2014, the production toured North America with showings planned in Springfield, Oklahoma City, Tulsa, Albuquerque, Salt Lake City, Spokane, Seattle, New York City, Chicago, Costa Mesa and Denver. The Grinch was played by Shuler Hensley.

In 2015, the production toured in North America with shows in Worcester, Detroit, Appleton, Columbus, Jacksonville, Orlando and Fort Lauderdale. Stefán Karl performed as Grinch, Bob Lauder as Old Max, and Genny Gagnon and Rachel Katzke as Cindy Lou Who.

In 2019, the production toured in North America with shows in Las Vegas, Nevada, Denver, Colorado, Detroit, Michigan. Philip Bryan performed as Grinch and Rachel Ling Gordon as Cindy Lou Who.

 2018: Madison Square Garden 
The musical played December 13 through December 30 at the Hulu Theater. The Grinch was played by Gavin Lee due to Stefán Karl's death in August.

 2019: UK tour 
The musical made its UK premiere on a tour beginning at New Wimbledon Theatre (1 - 3 November 2019) before touring to SEC Armadillo, Glasgow (13 - 17 November), Motorpoint Arena Cardiff (20 - 24 November), Edinburgh Festival Theatre (26 November - 1 December), The Alexandra, Birmingham (3 - 8 December) and The Lowry, Salford (10 December - 5 January 2020).

 2020: TV Special 
A poorly received television adaptation titled Dr. Seuss' The Grinch Musical Live!'' premiered on December 9, 2020 on NBC. Matthew Morrison plays The Grinch, Denis O'Hare plays Old Max, Booboo Stewart plays Young Max and Amelia Minto plays Cindy Lou Who.

Musical numbers

 "Who Likes Christmas?" – Citizens of Whoville
 "This Time of Year" – Old Max and Young Max
 "I Hate Christmas Eve" – The Grinch, Young Max and the Whos
 "Whatchama Who" – The Grinch and the Little Whos
 "Welcome, Christmas*" – Citizens of Whoville
 "I Hate Christmas Eve (Reprise)" – The Grinch
 "It's the Thought That Counts" – The Citizens of Whoville
 "One of a Kind" – The Grinch
 "Now's the Time" – Papa Who, Mama Who, Grandma Who, Grandpa Who

 "You're a Mean One, Mr. Grinch*" – Old Max, Young Max and the Grinch
 "Santa for a Day" – Cindy Lou Who and the Grinch
 "You're a Mean One, Mr. Grinch (Reprise)*" – Old Max
 "Who Likes Christmas? (Reprise)" – Citizens of Whoville
 "One of a Kind (Reprise)" – Young Max, The Grinch and Cindy Lou Who
 "This Time of Year (Reprise)" – Old Max
 "Welcome, Christmas (Reprise)*" – Citizens of Whoville
 "Santa For a Day (Reprise)" – Company
 "Who Likes Christmas? (Reprise)" – Company

 Music by Albert Hague, lyrics by Dr. Seuss

Casts

References

External links
 Official Website
 Official site of Dr. Seuss' HOW THE GRINCH STOLE CHRISTMAS! The Musical at the Pantages Theatre, Hollywood CA
 Internet Broadway Database listing for all productions
 Old Globe Theatre site

1994 musicals
Broadway musicals
Adaptations of works by Dr. Seuss
One-act musicals
Christmas musicals
The Grinch (franchise)